The John Young Monument is a monument of Canadian politician John Young by sculptor Louis-Philippe Hébert. It is located at the Old Port of Montreal, where Young was the first Chairman of the Port Commission.

Overview  

This monument in memory of John Young was erected in front of the port in 1908, on the initiative of the John Young Memorial Committee. It was moved to its current location in front of the Allan Building on rue de la Commune at Saint-Pierre in 1997. John Young was the first Chairman of the Port Commission, responsible for enlarging and developing the port. His efforts were so important that after his death in 1878, he was considered to be the "father" of the port. A figure of Neptune, symbolically representing the St. Lawrence River, sits at the base of the monument. 

Louis-Philippe Hébert sculpted the figures in 1895.

This monument in memory of John Young was unveiled on October 4, 1911, the year of the hundredth birthday of John Young.

References

External links
 
 http://www.vieux.montreal.qc.ca/inventaire/fiches/fiche_art.php?id=5

 
1895 sculptures
1911 in Canada
Bronze sculptures in Canada
Buildings and structures completed in 1908 
History of Montreal
Monuments and memorials in Montreal
Old Montreal
Outdoor sculptures in Montreal
Sculptures by Louis-Philippe Hébert 
Sculptures of men in Canada
Sculptures of classical mythology
Statues in Canada
Cultural depictions of politicians
Cultural depictions of Canadian men
Statues of politicians
Sculptures of Neptune